Southern Methodist University Press (or SMU Press) was a university press that is part of Southern Methodist University.  It was established in 1937 and released eight to ten titles each year and was known for its literary fiction. It was scheduled to suspend operations on June 1, 2010. The provost of SMU announced in 2011 plans to reorganize the press with a smaller budget and different goals. It closed again in 2015.

History
The first book published by the press was Samuel Wood Greiser's Naturalists of the Frontier (1937). However, the unofficial start of the SMU Press was in 1924, when the Southwest Review was moved from Austin to Dallas. John H. McGinnis served as the unpaid, unofficial editor-in-chief of the Southwest Review from 1927 to 1943 and played an essential role in founding the press. McGinnis acted as the unofficial director of the press during its first five years, in which only three titles were published. In 1939 Maxwell Allen was the first to become a paid employee of the press. From 1942 to 1945, Allen served in the Navy and then returned on January 1, 1946, as the director of the SMU Press. He continued as director until his retirement in 1981. The press reached its 100th title published in 1964.

See also

 List of English-language book publishing companies
 List of university presses

References

External links
Southern Methodist University Press
Southern Methodist University Press records

Press
University presses of the United States
Publishing companies established in 1937
Book publishing companies based in Texas